"Yellow" is the 10th single from Japanese pop singer Kaela Kimura.  It peaked at #5 on the Japanese Oricon charts.

Track listing
"Yellow"
"No reason why"
"dejavu"

References

2007 singles
Kaela Kimura songs
Japanese-language songs
2007 songs